The NCAA Division I Men's Lacrosse Championship tournament determines the annual top men's field lacrosse team in the NCAA  Division I. This tournament has determined the national champion since the inaugural 1971 NCAA Division I Men's Lacrosse Championship. From 1936 through 1970, the United States Intercollegiate Lacrosse Association (USILA) awarded the Wingate Memorial Trophy annually to the collegiate champion based on regular season records.

History 

The first Division I Championship tournament held in 1971 replaced the USILA and Wingate Memorial Trophy national title awards. As of 2021, 50 NCAA tournaments have been held (not held in 2020). In that span eleven teams — Johns Hopkins, Syracuse, Princeton, North Carolina, Virginia, Cornell, Duke, Maryland, Loyola University (Maryland), Denver and Yale — have won the national title, with Syracuse leading with ten titles (plus one vacated by the NCAA). In all, 41 teams have participated in the NCAA tournament since its inception. Only seven unseeded teams — the 1988 Cornell Big Red, the 1991 Towson Tigers, the 2006 Massachusetts Minutemen, the 2010 Notre Dame Fighting Irish, the 2011 and 2012 Maryland Terrapins and the 2016 North Carolina Tar Heels — have made it to the championship game, and only ten unseeded teams have made it to the tournament semi-finals, the most recent being North Carolina in 2016. Johns Hopkins has appeared in every tournament but three (1971, 2013, 2021). The Number One seed in the tournament has won the title 17 times and there have been 13 undefeated National Champions. North Carolina in 2016 was the first unseeded team to win the national title.

Originally consisting of eight teams, the size of the tournament field has changed over the years, increasing to 10 in 1986, 12 in 1987, 16 in 2003, 18 in 2014, down to 17 in 2017, down again to 16 in 2021, and finally back up to 18 in 2022. The two semifinal games and the final have been played on the same weekend at the same stadium since 1986. All three matches have always been scheduled for Memorial Day weekend, with the semifinals doubleheader on Saturday afternoon and the final held on the holiday itself.

The sport has historically been focused in the Northeast and Mid-Atlantic states, with the sport's U.S. heartland today extending from New England to North Carolina. Only six schools from outside the Northeast/Mid-Atlantic have played in the NCAA tournament—Air Force, Butler, Denver, Marquette, Notre Dame, and Ohio State. No team west of the Eastern Time Zone won an NCAA championship until Denver in 2015.

19 coaches have won Division I titles: Richie Moran, Glenn Thiel, Bud Beardmore, Bob Scott, Henry Ciccarone, Willie Scroggs, Jr., Roy Simmons, Jr., Dave Klarmann, Don Zimmerman, Bill Tierney, Dom Starsia, John Desko, Dave Pietramala, John Danowski, Charley Toomey, John Tillman, Joe Breschi, Andy Shay, and Lars Tiffany. Tierney is the only one to have won at two different schools (Princeton and Denver).

Results

Team titles

Finals appearances by state

Team Championships 1881–present
Below is a list of team championship titles, inclusive of those awarded prior to the formation of the NCAA Division I Championship. These include the ILA champions (1881–1898), the USIULL and ILA champions (1899–1905), the USILL champions (1906–1925), the USILA champions (1926–1935), and the Wingate Memorial Trophy (1936–1972) recipients. Of note several schools have claimed their Northern and Southern Division titles won during the USILL years as national championships (based on the results of 3 or 4 intra-division games), while others have not. Still others were acclaimed in their time as unofficial title winners based on being leading teams in the collegiate ranks in particular years. Furthermore, the USILL (1906–1925) was a closed membership organization. Some strong teams of the era, such as Army and Navy, were never members, so that in some years, the USILL champion was not necessarily the best team in the United States.

Championships by state

See also
NCAA Division I Men's Lacrosse Championship all-time team records
NCAA Division I Men's Lacrosse Championship appearances by school
NCAA Division I Undefeated National Champions
NCAA Division II Men's Lacrosse Championship
NCAA Division III Men's Lacrosse Championship
NCAA Division I Women's Lacrosse Championship
North–South Senior All-Star Game
United States Intercollegiate Lacrosse Association
Wingate Memorial Trophy

Notes

References

External links
NCAA page for men's lacrosse

 
Recurring sporting events established in 1971
1971 establishments in the United States